The Marapanim River is a river of the state of Pará, Brazil.

Course

The Marapanim River rises in the municipality of São Francisco do Pará.
It flows in a generally north direction, and enters the Atlantic Ocean just past Marapanim, Pará, which lies on its left bank.
The eastern side of the Marapanim Bay before Maiandeua Island is protected by the  Maracanã Marine Extractive Reserve, created in 2002.
Further south the eastern side is protected by the Cuinarana Marine Extractive Reserve.
The western side is protected by the  Mestre Lucindo Marine Extractive Reserve, created in 2014.

Environment

At its mouth the river is mainly bordered by mud flats.
The area around Rio Marapanim has a low population, with about 18 people per square kilometre.  
The area has a monsoon climate.

See also
List of rivers of Pará

References

Sources

Rivers of Pará